Kattupalli Island, also referred to sometimes as the Ennore Island is an island on the southern periphery of the Pulicat Lake and separated from the mainland by backwaters. The Kattupalli Shipyard is located on the island. The island is covered by scrub jungle and has some casuarina and coconut plantations. Many varieties of animals and birds are found here.

References

Islands of Chennai
Uninhabited islands of India
Islands of India